New Kids on the Block - Greatest Hits is the second greatest hits album by New Kids on the Block, and their seventh altogether. It was originally released on February 16, 1999 with hits from previous albums. On August 12, 2008, a new edition of Greatest Hits was released. This was the fourth hits album from the band featuring a new track list (18 in total).

Track listing (1999 Edition)

New Kids on the Block: Greatest Hits (2008 Edition)
"Step by Step" - 4:29
"You Got It (The Right Stuff)" - 4:13
"I'll Be Loving You (Forever)" - 4:28
"Cover Girl" - 4:10
"Didn't I (Blow Your Mind)" - 4:22
"Please Don't Go Girl" - 4:13
"Tonight" - 3:29
"Valentine Girl" - 4:02
"Let's Try It Again" - 3:53
"Hangin' Tough" - 3:54
"If You Go Away" - 4:03
"Baby, I Believe in You" - 4:33
"Games" (The Kids Get Hard Mix) - 5:24
"My Favorite Girl" - 5:30
"The Right Combination" (Seiko with Wahlberg) - 4:28
"Angel of Love" (Ana with Knight) - 4:21
"Stay the Same" (McIntyre) - 3:49
"2008 New Kids on the Block Mega Mix" - 5:01

Walmart Collector's Fan Pack
Walmart sold a limited edition "Fan Pack" containing the 2008 re-release of the Greatest Hits album above with the Greatest Hits: The Videos DVD.

Greatest Hits: The Videos DVD
Program Start
"Step by Step"
"You Got It (The Right Stuff)"
"I'll Be Loving You (Forever)"
"Cover Girl"
"Didn't I (Blow Your Mind)" (Live)
"Please Don't Go Girl"
"Tonight"
"This One's for the Children"
"Valentine Girl" (Live)
"Hangin' Tough"
"Baby, I Believe in You" (Live)
"Call It What You Want"
"If You Go Away"
"No More Games" (Live)
"Tonight" (Live)
"Step by Step" (Live)
End Credits

Chart positions

References

http://www.walmart.com/catalog/product.do?product_id=10238873

New Kids on the Block albums
1999 compilation albums
2008 compilation albums
2008 video albums
Music video compilation albums